Carlos Maynard (born 24 January 1995) is a West Indian cricketer. He made his List A debut for Combined Campuses and Colleges in the 2017–18 Regional Super50 on 30 January 2018.

References

External links
 

1995 births
Living people
Place of birth missing (living people)
Combined Campuses and Colleges cricketers